Fukuro may refer to:
, in Buddhist temple architecture, a set of covered corridors supported by three rows of pillars
Fukuro Station, Kumamoto, Japan
Fukuro, a former village merged into Kuga, Gunma, Japan
Fukuro, a former village merged into Uguisuzawa, Miyagi, Japan